, officially , is a Ryukyuan gusuku built in Nanzan and used until 1429. It, and the village of Ōzato, are named after the Ōzato Dynasty of Nanzan. It is in ruins, and is an officially designated historical site in Nanjō City, Okinawa.

History
Nanzan was established in 1314 when the Lord of Shimajiri-Ōzato, Ōzato Ofusato, broke away from the chieftain Tamagusuku at Urasoe Castle. The castle was built in the 14th century West of the farming village of Ōzato, and became the seat of the Aji of Ōzato Magiri. It fell into disuse after the capture of Nanzan Castle in 1429. During an excavation of the site, Chinese ceramics were found, showing the extensive trade that Nanzan had done with Ming China. In 2012, Ōzato castle became an officially designated historical site on Okinawa Island.

References

External links
http://english.ryukyushimpo.jp/2011/11/29/3883/
http://okininjakitty.wordpress.com/2013/02/28/ozato-castle-ruins/

Castles in Okinawa Prefecture